Freaney is a surname, and may refer to:

 Cyril Freaney, All-Ireland Gaelic football finalist in 1955
 Ollie Freaney, All-Ireland Gaelic football champion in 1958

Surnames